The following highways are numbered 232:

Canada
 Manitoba Provincial Road 232
 Newfoundland and Labrador Route 232
 Prince Edward Island Route 232
 Quebec Route 232

Costa Rica
 National Route 232

Ireland
 R232 regional road

Japan
 Japan National Route 232

Hungary
Route 232 (Hungary)

United States
 California State Route 232
 Georgia State Route 232
Hawaii Route 232 (former)
 Indiana State Road 232
 K-232 (Kansas highway)
 Maine State Route 232
 Minnesota State Highway 232 (former)
 Montana Secondary Highway 232
 Nevada State Route 232
 New York State Route 232
 Ohio State Route 232
 Oregon Route 232 (former)
 Pennsylvania Route 232
 South Dakota Highway 232 (former)
 Tennessee State Route 232
 Texas State Highway Loop 232
 Utah State Route 232
 Vermont Route 232
 Virginia State Route 232
 Washington State Route 232 (former)
 Wyoming Highway 232